Imma acrognampta is a moth of the family Immidae. It was described by Edward Meyrick in 1930. It is endemic to New Guinea.

References

Immidae
Moths described in 1930
Moths of New Guinea
Taxa named by Edward Meyrick
Endemic fauna of New Guinea